Patthar Aur Payal is a 1974 Bollywood action film directed by Harmesh Malhotra and produced by K.P. Singh. The film stars Dharmendra, Hema Malini, Vinod Khanna, Ajit, Rajendranath, Iftekhar and Jayshree T.

Cast
 Dharmendra as Ranjeet Singh "Chhote Thakur"
 Hema Malini as Asha Sinha
 Vinod Khanna as Surajbhan Singh "Sarju"
 Ajit as Ajit Singh "Bade Thakur"
 Rajendranath as Shankar Dayal
 Jayshree T. as Rita
 Iftekhar as DIG B. K. Verma
 D. K. Sapru as Rai Bahadur Shiv Narayan Sinha
 M. B. Shetty as Heera

Plot 
A story about two brothers' parent that was hanged due to a Thakur having given a false statement in court. They become dacoit (bandits) for revenge.

Soundtrack

References

External links 
 

1970s Hindi-language films
Films scored by Kalyanji Anandji
Indian Western (genre) films
Films directed by Harmesh Malhotra
1974 Western (genre) films
1974 films